The Brabo Fountain is located in the Grote Markt (main square) of Antwerp, Belgium, in front of the City Hall. The ceremonial inauguration of the sculpture took place in 1887. Jef Lambeaux realized the set of the bronze fountain.

The reason is the legend of the name of the city, in which it is said that the giant Druon Antigoon cut off a hand to all the ship captains who moored in the area and refused to pay toll, then throwing it to the Scheldt. The captain of the Roman army Brabo cut off the giant's hand imitating what he had done. The fountain reflects the moment when the Brabo throws the giant's hand into the river. According to this legend, the etymology of the name of the city Antwerp is a composition of the Dutch words "(h)ant" (hand) and "werpen" (launch).

However, John Lothrop Motley argues, and so do a lot of Dutch etymologists and historians, that Antwerp's name derives from "anda" (at) and "werpum" (wharf) to give an 't werf (on the wharf, in the same meaning as the current English wharf). Aan 't werp (at the warp) is also possible. This "warp" (thrown ground) is a man-made hill or a river deposit, high enough to remain dry at high tide, whereupon a construction could be built that would remain dry. Another word for werp is pol (dyke)  hence polders (the dry land behind a dyke, that was no longer flooded by the tide).

References

Fountains in Belgium
Buildings and structures in Antwerp